Rua XV de Novembro (15 November Street) is one of the major streets in downtown Curitiba. Also known as Rua das Flores (Flower Street), it is one of the first major pedestrian streets in Brazil. It was inaugurated in 1972, with well-tended pots of flowers and tourist restaurants installed in hundred-year-old buildings. The transformation of the street was one of the first projects of the mayor of Curitiba, Jaime Lerner, who was an urban planner.

It is very common to see every kind of artistic performances, such as mimes and clowns who interact with those who pass by, musicians, magicians and other miscellaneous performers, such as the Statue Man.

External links

Transport in Curitiba
Streets in Brazil
Pedestrian malls
Tourist attractions in Curitiba